Live at the Temple Bar and More is the first live album from alternative rock band Fishbone. The album was recorded live in various locations throughout August and September 2001.

The album contains all new material never released on any previous Fishbone album. Though the band recorded most of the tracks as part of the 2001 "Hen House" sessions (whose recording process is documented on the unauthorized Critical Times - Fishbone's Hen House Sessions DVD), the band decided to bypass their usual record company hassles by releasing the new songs in a live format on their own independent record label. Although the band suffered considerable record company troubles following the release of their previous three studio albums, the band remained a popular live concert attraction.

Track listing

Personnel 

 Angelo Moore - saxophone, vocals
 Walter A. Kibby II - trumpet, vocals
 Spacey T - guitar
 John Norwood Fisher - bass guitar, vocals
 John Steward - drums

References 

2002 live albums
Fishbone albums